I.T is a Hong Kong fashion and investment conglomerate founded in November 1988. It owns a number of Hong Kong brands which it retails as well as distributing European and Japanese brands such as French Connection and A Bathing Ape. It has a large presence in Asia and several stores in a single mall in Richmond, British Columbia (in Canada closed in 2019).

Its head office is on the 31st floor of Tower A of Southmark (南滙廣場) in Wong Chuk Hang, while its registered office is in Hamilton, Bermuda.

History 
I.T started in November 1988 by brothers, Sham Kar Wai and Sham Kin Wai, as a distributor of "hard to find" labels in Hong Kong, but more recently developed its own fashion brands.

Stores

I.T operates stores under the name "I.T" for distributing more expensive, Japanese and European brands, and "i.t" which distributes all other youthful brands under its name, and also operates individual stores for its sub-brands, such as 5CM.

Brands owned

In-house brands
5cm
b+ab
Izzue.com
CHOCOOLATE
tout a coup
A Bathing Ape
fingercroxx
Venilla Suite
CAMPER
Licensed brands
X-Large
Hyoma
Clotechnow.com
as known as de Rue
MLB
Techwear

References

External links
 Official site

Companies listed on the Hong Kong Stock Exchange
Clothing brands of Hong Kong
Clothing companies established in 1988
Clothing companies of Hong Kong
Conglomerate companies of Hong Kong
Clothing retailers of Hong Kong